Spodnji Gasteraj is a settlement in the Municipality of Sveti Jurij v Slovenskih Goricah in northeastern Slovenia. The area is part of the traditional region of Styria. It is now included in the Drava Statistical Region.

A small chapel-shrine in the settlement dates to the early 20th century.

References

External links
Spodnji Gasteraj at Geopedia

Populated places in the Municipality of Sveti Jurij v Slovenskih Goricah